Metathrinca illuvialis is a moth in the family Xyloryctidae. It was described by Edward Meyrick in 1914. It is found in Assam, India.

The wingspan is about 26 mm. The forewings are whitish ochreous, with a faint grey tinge and with the costal edge dark fuscous towards the base. There is a submarginal series of seven large black dots around the apex and termen. The hindwings are ochreous whitish.

References

Metathrinca
Moths described in 1914